5-TFM-DMT (5-(trifluoromethyl)-DMT, 5-CF3-DMT, 5-(trifluoromethyl)-N,N-dimethyltryptamine) is a putative psychedelic tryptamine derivative related to drugs such as 5-MeO-DMT, 5-Fluoro-DMT, and 5-TFMO-DMT. Although it has been indexed by the Chemical Abstract Service as its free base and hydrochloride salt, nothing is known of its pharmacology.

See also
 5-MeO-DMT
 5-Bromo-DMT
 5-Chloro-DMT
 5-Fluoro-DMT
 5-TFMO-DMT

References 

Psychedelic tryptamines
Tryptamines
Trifluoromethyl compounds
Dimethylamino compounds